Dvitiya also referred to as Beej and Dooj is the Sanskrit word for "second", and is the second day of the lunar fortnight (Paksha) of the Hindu calendar. Each Hindu month has two dvitiya days, being the second day of the "bright" (Shukla) and of the "dark" (Krishna) fortnights respectively. Dvitiya occurs on the second and the seventeenth day of each month.

Occasions
 Bhau-beej, the last day of the Deepavali festival, occurs on the dvitiya of the month of Kartika.
 Ramdevpir-dooj or Ramdevpir-beej, the second day of Shukla paksha of  Bhadra month is celebrated as the birthday of Ramdevji in northwestern India.

References

Hindu calendar
02